Frank Bonner (born Frank Woodrow Boers Jr.; February 28, 1942 – June 16, 2021) was an American actor and television director widely known for his role as sales manager Herb Tarlek on the television sitcom WKRP in Cincinnati.

Personal life
Bonner was born in Little Rock, Arkansas, to Grace Marie "Mamie" (née Dobbins) Boers Delahoussay, a singer, and Frank Woodrow Boers, a saxophonist. He grew up in Malvern, Arkansas.

In 1979, Bonner was injured in a parasailing accident at the El Mirage Lake Off-Highway Vehicle Recreation Area, northeast of Los Angeles. Subsequently, he appeared on crutches in episodes of WKRP in Cincinnati (the season 2 episode "A Family Affair") and an All-Star Special episode of Family Feud.

Bonner was married to Sharon Gray from 1966–1971; actress Mary Alice Rings from 1972–1975; playwright Lillian Garrett-Groag from 1977–1980; Catherine M. Sherwood from 1981 until their divorce (date indeterminate); and Gayle Hardage, his former high school sweetheart in Malvern, Arkansas, from 2006 until his death. 

Bonner died on June 16, 2021, aged 79, in Laguna Niguel, California, of complications from Lewy body dementia.

Frank Bonner had five children (four biological), seven grandchildren, and one great-grandchild at his death. He had a daughter, Desiree Boers-Kort, with his first wife, Sharon Gray. He had three sons (Michael, Matthew, and Justin);  Michael preceded his father. Bonner also had a step-daughter, DeAndra Freed.

Career
Bonner began acting in the experimental 1967 independent film The Equinox ... A Journey into the Unknown, which was reshot and re-edited as the 1970 cult classic Equinox (in which he is credited as Frank Boers Jr.).

He later had several small roles in movies and on television, including Mannix, Emergency!, and Love, American Style. In 1978 he joined the cast of WKRP in Cincinnati, finding his signature role as Herb Tarlek, the crass and ineffectual station advertising sales agent, noted for his garish plaid suits and white shoes. 

Bonner appeared as a guest star in two episodes of the sitcom Night Court in the 1980s. From 1988 to 1990, Bonner played the role of Father Hargis, headmaster of the fictional St. Augustine's Academy, on the TV show Just the Ten of Us, which was a spin-off of Growing Pains. He also appeared in one of the early episodes of the television show Newhart. He reprised the role of Herb Tarlek in the 1991 spinoff The New WKRP in Cincinnati and in a 2004 rock video for Canadian indie rock band Rheostatics (for the song "The Tarleks", from their album 2067).

After directing six episodes of WKRP in Cincinnati, he directed for other television shows in the 1980s and 1990s, including Who's the Boss?, Head of the Class, Evening Shade, Newhart and every episode of the NBC Saturday morning sitcom City Guys. Bonner also appeared in five episodes of Saved by the Bell: The New Class, and directed four episodes.

Filmography

As actor

As director

References

External links

1942 births
2021 deaths
American male television actors
American television directors
Male actors from Little Rock, Arkansas
20th-century American male actors
21st-century American male actors
Deaths from dementia in California
Deaths from Lewy body dementia